Al-Qāsim ibn Ibrāhīm al-Rassī (785–860) was a 9th-century religious leader in the Arabian Peninsula. He was one of the founders of the theological traditions of the Zaydi branch of Shi'a Islam, and is considered as an imam by the Zaydis. His grandson Yahya founded the Rassid dynasty of Zaydi imams of Yemen.

Life
Qasim was of al-Hasan, a son of Ali ibn Abu Talib, the son-in-law of Prophet Muhammad and first Shi'a imam. Qasim was a great-grandson of al-Hasan's grandson, Ibrahim al-Shibh. He was born and grew up in Medina, being taught Zaydi doctrine, the hadiths, and possibly the Quran and Arabic as well, by Abu Bakr Abd al-Hamid ibn Abi Uways, a nephew of the famed jurist Malik ibn Anas.

Qasim came to be recognized as one of the chief authorities of the Zaydi school of Shi'a Islam, and was honoured with the titles "Star of the Family of the Prophet of God" and "Interpreter of the Faith". His brother Muhammad, known as Ibn Tabataba, was recognized as imam, and raised a failed rebellion against the Abbasid Caliphate at Kufa in 814.

Qasim himself moved to Egypt sometime before 815, and probably settled at Fustat, the capital of Egypt. One later source claims that he was sent there by his brother, but this is unlikely, especially as Qasim objected to some of Ibn Tabataba's theological views. During his stay in Egypt, he studied Christian and Jewish theological writings, and debated both Muslim and non-Muslim scholars. A treatise refuting Christian theological views and another against a Manichaean treatise attributed to the scholar Ibn al-Muqaffa', were written during his stay in Egypt. At the same time, he was influenced by Christian views on God, and especially on free will.

Eventually, Qasim himself was widely acknowledged as an imam, receiving pledges of allegiance from various communities from the Hejaz, Iraq and Persia, but given the failure of his brother's uprising and similar Shi'a revolts in the past, he refrained from proclaiming himself in public or rising in revolt against the Abbasids. He spent the remainder of his life there, engaged in writing, and in teaching Zaydi faithful who came to visit him.

Qasim died in 860, a year after the birth of his grandson Yahya, who went on to found a line of Zaydi imams in Yemen that lasted into the 20th century, most of whom were descended from Qasim.

Teachings 
Qasim summarized his teachings in five "pillars", which echoed and revised those of the Mu'tazilite doctrine:
 In his views on God, the Christian influence is evident, as Qasim emphasized, according to Wilferd Madelung, the "total dissimilarity of God to all creation", and regarded "the essential generosity and goodness of God" as the chief divine attributes, while ignoring the Mu'tazilite distinction between divine "essence" and "act". 
 Following from the previous, Qasim's conception of divine justice "strictly dissociated God from evil acts and affirmed human free will", in the words of Madelung. He explicitly rejected the Mu'tazilite concept of "compensation" for the sufferings inflicted during one's life, especially since—another borrowing from Christian theology—the blessings conferred by God far outweighed any sufferings inflicted, just or unjust. On the issue of predestination, he followed a cautious middle road between the Mu'tazilite rejection of the concept, and the traditional Zaydi doctrine supporting it. 
 Consequent to his ideas on divine justice, Qasim affirmed the inevitability of the "promise and threat" of God, namely the punishment of sinners in the afterlife. In another distinction with Mu'tazilite thought, he firmly upheld the Zaydi doctrine that considered acts of injustice and oppression as a form of unbelief, even though they were not outright idolatry; this point in the Zaydi doctrine justified fighting against even Muslim rulers and their supporters if they were considered as oppressive.
 According to Qasim, the Quran was at the centre of all religious matters: accepting the Quran as "detailed, unambiguous and free of contradiction" (Madelung), he rejected claims by the Imami Shi'a (Twelver and Isma'ili) that some parts had been lost or altered. On the thorny issue of Quranic createdness, he avoided taking sides explicitly, although his theological positions imply that he leaned to the Mu'tazilite opinion that it was created, rather than the overwhelming contemporary Zaydi (and Sunni) view that it was not. At the same time, Qasim fiercely criticized the admission of un-Quranic  as legitimate , and accused the Sunni traditionalists of forging  and contributing to the oppressive regimes of the Muslim rulers of his time.
 As a result of his views on justice, Qasim considered the Muslim rulers of his time as illegitimate tyrants, and the lands they ruled as "abode of injustice", meaning that it was the duty of every faithful Muslim to emigrate (cf. also ) from their lands.

On the (Zaydi) imamate, Qasim stressed the religious qualifications of the candidate over the traditional requirement to lead an armed revolt. He rejected the first three Rashidun caliphs as illegitimate, and held Ali ibn Abi Talib as the only legitimate successor of Muhammad. He accepted the fifth Imami imam, Muhammad al-Baqir, but not his successors, whom he considered, in the words of Madelung, as "wordly exploiters of their pious followers".

His doctrines became the foundation for the religious and legal systems of the Zaydi principalities in Tabaristan and Yemen, but were heavily amended by his grandson Yahya to a more mainstream Shi'a and Mu'tazilite direction.

See also 
Ahmad ibn Isa ibn Zayd

References

Sources

Further reading 
 

785 births
860 deaths
9th-century people from the Abbasid Caliphate
9th-century Muslim theologians
People from Medina
Rassid dynasty
Zaydi imams
Zaidiyyah scholars